Earth science (also known as geoscience, the geosciences or the Earth Sciences) is an all-embracing term for the sciences related to the planet Earth. It is arguably a special case in planetary science, the Earth being the only known life-bearing planet. There are both reductionist and holistic approaches to Earth science. There are four major disciplines in earth sciences, namely geography, geology, geophysics and geodesy. These major disciplines use physics, chemistry, biology, chronology and mathematics to build a quantitative understanding of the principal areas or spheres of the Earth system.

Articles related to Earth science include:

A 
 Antarctic convergence
 Atmospheric chemistry
 Atmospheric physics
 Atmospheric sciences

B 
 Biosphere
 Biogeography

C 
 Cartography
 Chemical oceanography
 Climatology
 Crust
 Cryosphere
 Crystallography (mineralogy)

D 
 Dynamo theory

E 
 Earth's core
 Earth's magnetic field
 Earth's mantle
 Economic geology
 Edaphology (soil science)
 Engineering geology
 Environmental geology
 Environmental science
 Erosion
 Exosphere (Atmospheric sciences)

G 
 Gaia hypothesis
 Gemology (mineralogy)
 Geochemistry
 Geochronology (Geophysics)
 Geodesy (see Surveying)
 Geodynamics (Geophysics and Tectonics)
 Geographical Information System
 Geography
 Geoinformatics (GIS)
 Geology
 Geomagnetics (Geophysics)
 Geomicrobiology
 Geomorphology
 Geophysics
 Geosphere
 Geostatistics
 Glaciology (Geology and Hydrology)
 Gravimetry (Geophysics)

H 
 Historical geology
 Human geography
 Hydrogeology
 Hydrology
 Hydrometeorology
 Hydrosphere

I
 Intertropical Convergence Zone

L 
 Limnology (Hydrology)
 Lithosphere (Geology)

M 
 Magma (Volcanology)
 Magnetosphere
 Marine biology (Oceanography)
 Marine geology (Oceanography)
 Meridional flow
 Mesosphere (Atmospheric sciences)
 Meteorology
 Micropaleontology
 Mineralogy

O 
 Oceanography

P 
 Paleoceanography
 Paleoclimatology
 Pedology (Soil science)
 Pedosphere (Soil science)
 Petrology (Geology)
 Physical geography
 Physical oceanography
 Planetary geology
 Plate tectonics

Q 
 Quaternary geology

R 
 Remote Sensing and GIS

S 
 Sedimentology (Geology)
 Seismology (Geophysics)
 Soil science
 Stratigraphy (Geology)
 Stratosphere (Atmospheric sciences)
 Structural geology
 Surveying (see Geodesy)

T 
 Thermosphere (Atmospheric sciences)
 Tropopause
 Troposphere (Atmospheric sciences)
 Tornadoes

V 
 Volcanology

Z
 Zonal flow

References

 

.
Science-related lists
Earth science topics (alphabetical)